The Table below list all the talukas (tahsils/tehsils) of all the thirty-six districts in the Indian state of Maharashtra, along with district-subdivision and urban status information of headquarters villages/towns, as all talukas are intermediate level panchayat between the zilla parishad (district councils) at the district level and gram panchayat (village councils) at the lower level.

Table

References

External links
 Districts of India

 
Maharashtra-related lists
Maharashtra